The Angel is one of the first electropneumatic paintball markers.  It was manufactured by Angel Paintball Sports (originally WDP) starting in 1997 and was introduced alongside Smart Parts' original Shocker.

The Angel was initially distributed in the United States by Brass Eagle as the 1455 Angel Semi-auto, advertised with a rate of 15 balls per second. This deal was short-lived, so WDP then distributed the Angel independently; refining the marker and releasing new models.

History
The Angel paintball marker was designed by engineer John Rice, as an HPA-only marker. Despite its ubiquitous use in the sport at the time, Rice considered CO2 a dirty gas, so the Angel used miniaturized components that could not withstand impurities in the air or the cooling effects of CO2. To cater to the sudden need for a high-flow HPA regulator, WDP released the Gov'nair high pressure air system.  The marker featured an electronic firing sequence and light trigger for effective shooting, and low learning curve - .  The first use of the Angel in a NPPL event was at the 1996 World Cup by Ted Kunewa with Washington Reign and Jacko with Banzai Bandits.

Operation
The Angel incorporates a linked bolt and hammer, tri-tubed design, and a four-way solenoid valve; referred to as a fourteen-way by Angel engineer Rice. The valve drives the ram and is essentially an electronically controlled version of the four-way valves mounted to the front block of Autococker markers.

The firing sequence is electronically controlled, and starts from the open bolt. At the pull of the trigger, an electronic impulse trips the four-way valve, pushing compressed gas through the ram from behind, forcing the ram and bolt assembly to move towards the valve, impacting the poppet and releasing gas to the chamber. The paintball is fired with this gas, then the four-way solenoid reverses, and delivers gas to the front of the ram, returning the ram and bolt assembly to their starting position.

Design evolution

References

External links 
Angel Paintball Sports Official Website
Angel Owners Group - Official Angel Owners Group

Paintball markers